Derrick Lothair Frazier (born April 29, 1970) is a former American football cornerback in the National Football League. He was drafted by the Philadelphia Eagles in the third round of the 1993 NFL Draft and played for the team from 1993 to 1995. He played for the Indianapolis Colts and Dallas Cowboys in 1996. He played college football at Texas A&M.

Professional career
Frazier was selected by the Philadelphia Eagles in the third round (75th overall) of the 1993 NFL Draft with a pick obtained from the Houston Oilers in a trade. On July 14, 1993, Frazier signed two one-year contracts with the team with an option year. While competing for the starting left cornerback job in the preseason, he injured his right knee during an American Bowl loss to the New Orleans Saints in Tokyo on July 31. He was placed on injured reserve on August 24.

Frazier played in twelve games in 1994 with a fumble recovery and three tackles. After Eric Allen left the team following the season, Frazier was expected to start at right cornerback in 1995. Frazier had 26 tackles and one interception in 1995.

Following the 1995 season, Frazier signed with the Indianapolis Colts after his contract expired with the Eagles. He broke his right arm early in the 1996 season, but managed to start in four games for the Colts and record 13 tackles. He was waived in the first week of December and was signed by the Dallas Cowboys.

After football
Frazier and former Texas A&M roommate Quentin Coryatt created a men's lifestyle magazine, Controversy, in 2002.

Frazier was married to Candice Manning.  He shares one daughter with her, fellow Aggie, Tia Frazier. He is currently married to Leslee Frazier and shares 4 sons with her.

Frazier coaches high school football in Gilbert, Arizona.

References

1970 births
Living people
People from Sugar Land, Texas
Players of American football from Texas
Sportspeople from the Houston metropolitan area
American football cornerbacks
Texas A&M Aggies football players
Philadelphia Eagles players
Indianapolis Colts players
Dallas Cowboys players